Matt Tee graduated from the University of Leeds (Mathematics 1996). He was previously the Permanent Secretary for Government Communications in the Cabinet Office. After several roles in public sector communications, Tee served as the Director of Business Development at Dr Foster. He then served as the interim Director General of Communications in the Department of Health for 2006–7, before being appointed Chief Executive of NHS Direct in July 2007. Tee became Permanent Secretary for Government Communications in the Cabinet Office. In November 2010 it was announced that Tee would leave his post heading Government Communications in March 2011 following a review of the Central Office of Information. He was the first Chief Executive of the Independent Press Standards Organisation (IPSO), serving from September 2014 until March 2020.

References 

Living people
Permanent Secretaries of the Cabinet Office
Civil servants in the Ministry of Health (United Kingdom)
Alumni of the University of Leeds
Year of birth missing (living people)